Ayataka is a brand of iced green tea produced by The Coca-Cola Company that is sold in Japan, Malaysia and Singapore (under the Heaven and Earth brand).

References

External links 
 Product web site 

Coca-Cola brands
Japanese drinks
Tea brands in Japan